Vaivase-Tai is a Samoan football club based in Tuanaimato. It currently plays in Samoa National League. As eight times champions of Samoa, they have won more recorded titles than any other club.

History
Vaivase-Tai won four of the first five national championships, with only Alafua winning a championship outright prior to 1984. They won further championships in 1998 and 2006. They were also runners up in 1985.

Titles
Samoa National League: 7
1979, 1980, 1981, 1983,
, 1998. 
,2006 , 2022.

Squad
As of 2020 season:

References

Football clubs in Samoa